

The Wildalmkirchl is a rocky peak, on the southern edge of the Steinernes Meer. It lies within the Austrian state of Salzburg, northeast of the village of Maria Alm and northwest of the Hochkönig massif.

The first part of its name comes from the Wildalm ("wild alpine meadow"), a remote high valley located north of the Wildalmkirchl in the Austro-Bavarian border region in the Steinernes Meer range; the second part of its name is derived from the shape of the mountain which, from various standpoints resembles a church with its roof and tower.
At a height of 2,457 m, northeast of the summit, is the Wildalmkirchl bothy or "wilderness hut" (Biwakschachtel) (open, 8 sleeping places).

The Wildalmkirchl, along with the Schottmalhorn, is the most difficult mountain to climb in the Steinernes Meer; all ascents involve climbing. The easiest route runs from the bothy to the northeastern of the "church" formation and up onto the "roof" (crumbling, I); the route then crosses the exposed Kirchdachgrat arête forming the ridge of the "roof", and scales the very exposed summit block which requires moderately difficult climbing at grade (II); in all this takes about 40 minutes of climbing time from the bothy.

Approaches 
 from Maria Alm (802 m) or Hinterthal (1,016 m) along path no. 426 via the Wasserfallscharte gap (2,421 m) in 5–6 hours (high Alpine, easy climbing necessary, tricky fields of old snow until late in the year).
 from the plateau of the Steinernes Meer along path no. 401 (from the Riemannhaus or the Kärlinger Haus via the Hochbrunnsulzen Pass, 2,356 m).
 from the Wasseralm via the Wildalm and cross over in front of the Hochbrunnsulzen climbing path heading south to path no. 401.
 from the southeast along path no. 401 (from the Hochkönig massif or from Hinterthal climbing via the Torscharte gap, 2,246 m).

Gallery

Maps 
Alpine Club map 1:25,000, Sheets 10/1 "Steinernes Meer" and 10/2 "Hochkönig und Hagengebirge"

External links 

 Information and a picture of the Wildalmkirchl bothy
 Photography with a view from the north into the Steinernes Meer; below left: the Wildalmkirchl with its striking, church-like shape

Two-thousanders of Austria
Berchtesgaden Alps
Mountains of the Alps
Mountains of Salzburg (state)